Steve Van Matre (born March 20, 1941) is an American environmental activist, author and educator. He is the founder of the Earth Education movement and chair of the Institute for Earth Education. Steve was a professor In the Leisure and Environmental Resources Association(LERA) at George Williams College Downers Grove ill  in the '70s and '80s.

Biography
Van Matre was a professor of environmental education and interpretation at George Williams College (later Aurora University).

Published works

Acclimatization (1972)
Acclimatizing (1974)
Sunship Earth (1979)	
"Earth Magic" and "Snow Walk" with Kirk Hoessle (1980)
The Earth Speaks (1983)
Conceptual Encounters I (1987)

Earthkeepers with Bruce Johnson (1988)
Conceptual Encounters II (1990)
Earth Education: A New Beginning (1990)
SUNSHIP III (1997)
Rangers of the Earth (2004)
Interpretive Design...and the dance of experience (2009)

References

External links
Institute for Earth Education
Interview with SVM
Interview with SVM about Earth Education vs. environmental education

1941 births
Living people
American environmentalists